Yvonne Earl is a retired British rower who competed for Great Britain.

Rowing career
Earl was part of the coxed four that finished 9th overall and fourth in the B final at the 1977 World Rowing Championships in Amsterdam.

She later competed at the 1979 World Rowing Championships.

References

Living people
British female rowers
Year of birth missing (living people)